The 2018 Makati Super Crunch season is the 1st season of the franchise in the Maharlika Pilipinas Basketball League (MPBL).

Key dates
 June 12, 2018: Regular Season Begins.

Current roster

Datu Cup

Standings

Game log

|- style="background:#bfb;"
| 1
| June 19
| Basilan
| W 77–65
| Philip Paniamogan (19)
| Cedric Ablaza (7)
| Rudy Lingganay (3)
| Bulacan Capitol Gymnasium
| 1–0
|- style="background:#bfb;"
| 2
| June 28
| Manila
| W 99–98
| Jeckster Apinan (24)
| Jeckster Apinan (8)
| Rudy Lingganay (5)
| Ynares Center
| 2–0

|- style="background:#fcc;"
| 3
| July 10
| Batangas City
| L 65–72
| Jeckster Apinan (16)
| Jeckster Apinan (12)
| Philip Paniamogan (4)
| Batangas City Coliseum
| 2–1
|- style="background:#bfb;"
| 4
| July 19
| Davao Occidental
| W 79–77
| Cedric Ablaza (16)
| Jeckster Apinan (10)
| Philip Paniamogan (4)
| Alonte Sports Arena
| 3–1
|- style="background:#bfb;"
| 5
| July 31
| General Santos
| W 86–71
| Philip Paniamogan (28)
| Jeckster Apinan (9)
| Rudy Lingganay (7)
| Ynares Center
| 4–1

|- style="background:#fcc;"
| 6
| August 9
| Imus
| L 76–79
| Jeckster Apinan (18)
| Ablaza, Apinan (7)
| Ablaza, Lingganay (5)
| Imus City Sports Complex
| 4–2
|- style="background:#d3d3d3;"
| 
| August 18
| Quezon City
| colspan=6| Postponed (Failure to get clearance)

Playoffs

References

Makati Skyscrapers Season, 2018